Cosmin Paşca is a Romanian sprint canoer who competed from the mid to late 1990s. He won seven medals at the ICF Canoe Sprint World Championships with two golds (C-4 1000 m: 1995, 1997) and five silvers (C-4 500 m: 1994, 1995, 1997, 1998; C-4 1000 m: 1994).

References

Living people
Romanian male canoeists
Year of birth missing (living people)
ICF Canoe Sprint World Championships medalists in Canadian